Cyril Stanley "Bam" Bamberger,  (4 May 1919 – 3 February 2008) was a Royal Air Force pilot who fought in the Battle of Britain, the defence of Malta and the Korean War.

Early life
Bamberger was born in Hyde, Cheshire, and educated locally. He left school in 1934, aged 14, and joined Lever Brothers as an electrical apprentice.

In 1936, Bamberger volunteered for the Auxiliary Air Force and was posted to the bomber squadron, No. 610 (County of Chester) Squadron AuxAF (Auxiliary Air Force), as a photographer. Bamberger was accepted for pilot training with the Royal Air Force Volunteer Reserve (RAFVR) in 1938 (Service No. 810024).

Second World War
Bamberger was called to full-time service on the outbreak of war, completed his training and rejoined his former squadron, now with Spitfires, at RAF Biggin Hill on 27 July 1940, as a sergeant pilot. Bamberger flew with No. 610 Squadron during the early air fighting over the Channel that followed the Dunkirk evacuation. The squadron suffered heavy casualties but Bamberger was credited with a "probable" Messerschmitt Bf 109 on 28 August in combat off the Kent coast.

When No. 610 Squadron was withdrawn to rest in mid-September 1940, Bamberger was posted to No. 41 Squadron RAF at Hornchurch and was soon back in action in the Battle of Britain. He was credited with his first confirmed combat victory, again a Bf 109, over Canterbury on 5 October.

With the Battle of Britain winding down, Bamberger volunteered for Malta. He flew Hurricanes with No. 261 Squadron RAF from Hal Far from late November 1940 and was credited with shooting down two Junkers Ju 87 aircraft over the Grand Harbour in January 1941.

Bamberger joined No. 93 Squadron RAF in 1942 and was deployed to Tunisia. He was commissioned pilot officer (No. 116515) on 9 February 1942 and promoted to flying officer on 1 October 1942. With the same squadron, he returned to Malta in 1943 and was credited with another kill, again a Junkers Ju 87 on 13 July, this time over Sicily.

Bamberger was awarded the Distinguished Flying Cross (DFC) which was gazetted on 28 September 1943.

Bamberger was promoted to flight lieutenant on 9 February 1944, returned to the UK in July 1944 and in November of the same year was awarded a Bar to his DFC.

Later RAF career
Bamberger was released from RAF service in 1946 and he returned to Lever before joining the management of a Guinness subsidiary.

When No. 610 Squadron RAF was reformed as a Royal Auxiliary Air Force unit, Bamberger rejoined it as a flight commander and was given the rank of flight lieutenant. In 1950 he became the squadron's Commanding Officer, having converted to Gloster Meteor aircraft. After the outbreak of the Korean War Bamberger accepted a permanent RAF commission, and for most of the duration of that conflict was an intelligence officer at the Air Ministry. He was promoted to squadron leader on 1 January 1957.

Bamberger later converted to flying helicopters and flew the Bristol Sycamore aircraft in Aden. He retired in 1959, after being awarded the Air Efficiency Award with clasp.

Business career and later life
After retiring from the RAF in 1959, Bamberger went into business, founding a packaging materials company. He later ran an antiques business. He remained active in RAF matters and was closely involved with the Bentley Priory Battle of Britain Trust, of which he was vice-chairman.

Bamberger died on 3 February 2008, aged 88. He was survived by his wife Heather, whom he married in 1954, and by three sons and a daughter. It was Bam's granddaughter who presented the Duchess of Cornwall with a posy at the unveiling of the Battle of Britain Monument in London on 18 September 2005.

References

External links
 Wartime photo of Bamberger

1919 births
2008 deaths
British military personnel of the Aden Emergency
Royal Air Force squadron leaders
The Few
Royal Air Force pilots of World War II
People from Hyde, Greater Manchester
Recipients of the Distinguished Flying Cross (United Kingdom)
Royal Air Force personnel of the Korean War
Royal Air Force Volunteer Reserve personnel of World War II
Military personnel from Cheshire